Jim Hofher (born October 12, 1957) is an American football coach and former player. He served as the head football coach at Cornell University from 1990 to 1997 and at the University at Buffalo from 2001 to 2005, compiling a career college football record of 53–84. Hofher was the quarterbacks and wide receivers coach of the Atlanta Legends of the Alliance of American Football (AAF) in 2019.

Coaching career
Hofher's coaching career began in 1981 as the quarterbacks and wide receivers coach at Miami of Ohio. Since then he's held offensive assistant coaching positions at Wake Forest, Syracuse, Tennessee, North Carolina and Bowling Green. He was the head coach at Cornell from 1990 to 1997 and at Buffalo from 2001 to 2005. In 1998, Hofher resigned at Cornell to join the staff at North Carolina. Hofher spent one year as quarterbacks coach for at Bowling Green State University in 2008 under head coach Gregg Brandon. He was hired in 2009 by Delaware to serve as their offensive coordinator and quarterbacks coach. During the 2011 off-season, Hofher was considered a candidate by Boston College for the offensive coordinator position, but was not hired. After four seasons with the Blue Hens, Hofher was released on November 18, 2012, after the team posted a 5−6 record in 2012. From 2016-2017, he served as the passing game coordinator and quarterbacks coach at the Iowa State University.

Head coaching record

References

1957 births
Living people
American football quarterbacks
Atlanta Legends coaches
Bowling Green Falcons football coaches
Buffalo Bulls football coaches
Cornell Big Red football coaches
Cornell Big Red football players
Delaware Fightin' Blue Hens football coaches
Iowa State Cyclones football coaches
Miami RedHawks football coaches
Nevada Wolf Pack football coaches
North Carolina Tar Heels football coaches
Syracuse Orange football coaches
Tennessee Volunteers football coaches
Wake Forest Demon Deacons football coaches
Sportspeople from Middletown, Connecticut